Garz is a small municipality on the island of Usedom in the Vorpommern-Greifswald landkreis in the state of Mecklenburg-Vorpommern, Germany.

Adjacent to the town is the regional Heringsdorf Airport, before border controls between Poland and Germany were abolished in 2007 in accordance with the Schengen agreement. A border checkpoint with Świnoujście that was restricted to pedestrian/bicycle/bus traffic existed briefly.

References

External links

Official website of Garz (Usedom)

Vorpommern-Greifswald